Yanamadala Kasi Viswanath is an Indian actor and film director who works in Telugu cinema. He worked as an assistant director, associate director and co-director for over 25 films. He debuted as a director with the romantic comedy film Nuvvu Leka Nenu Lenu (2002) which became a blockbuster at the box office. Then, he directed Toli Choopulone (2003) which was Nandamuri Kalyan Ram's debut film.  Later, he turned an actor with the film Nachavule (2008) which became his breakthrough role. Since then, he has acted in more than 90 films.

Early life
He was born in Purushottapatnam, Seethanagaram mandal near Rajahmundry, East Godavari district of Andhra Pradesh. He completed his primary education in his native village. From 6th to 12th standard, he studied in Polavaram government high school. He did his B.Com. degree from Raja Mahendravaram. His uncles used to own a film theater. He used to watch films from his childhood. Inspired by the films he used to prepare simple scripts and narrate them to his mother. She also encouraged him.

When he was studying intermediate, he watched a film shooting of Tholi Kodi Koosindi (1981) directed by K. Balachander. He got inspired by that movie and used to discuss about films with his uncles. He proposed to his family that he would enter into film industry. His cousin Gadde Ratnaji Rao took him to Chennai and introduced him to Kanoori Ranjith Kumar who was producing the film Lanke Bindelu.

Film career

Film making
He started as assistant director to Vijaya Nirmala for the film Lanke Bindelu. When the film industry gradually shifted to Hyderabad, he moved there to work with Suresh Productions assisting in their film making. He worked as a co-director to hit films like Preminchukundam Raa (1997), Ganesh (1998), Kalisundam Raa (2000). Then he got promoted as a director for the film Nuvvu Leka Nenu Lenu (2002) written by himself. He also directed the film Toli Choopulone (2003) produced by Usha Kiran Movies. It was Nandamuri Kalyan Ram's first film as a lead actor.

Actor
He got good name as a director for his first film. When he was waiting for the next film, he visited Annavaram temple. Director Ravi Babu met him there and offered a father role in his upcoming film Nachavule (2008). Ravi Babu and Viswanath knew each other when they were working for Suresh Productions. He accepted that role and it got him good recognition as an actor. Later he played similar roles in many films.

Personal life
He has a sister. He has two daughters. Elder daughter is settled in the San Francisco U.S. His second daughter is studying engineering. Director Srivas is his cousin.

Filmography

Director

Actor

References

External links

Telugu male actors
Telugu film directors
People from East Godavari district
Film directors from Andhra Pradesh
Male actors from Andhra Pradesh
Indian male film actors
Male actors in Telugu cinema
21st-century Indian male actors